Jupiter is an unincorporated community in northwestern Buncombe County, North Carolina, United States, located off  U.S. Highway 25/70, and Interstate 26. It was disincorporated in 1970.

References
 

Unincorporated communities in Buncombe County, North Carolina
Unincorporated communities in North Carolina
Populated places disestablished in 1970
Asheville metropolitan area
Former municipalities in North Carolina
1970 disestablishments in North Carolina